Site 131, also known as Voskhod ( meaning Sunrise), was a launch complex at the Plesetsk Cosmodrome in Russia, used by Kosmos carrier rockets and R-14 missiles. It consisted of a single launch pad, which was used between 1967 and 1969.

The complex was used for early test flights of the Kosmos-3M. An R-14 missile was also launched from the pad in 1969. This launch, which occurred on 18 July, is the only launch that is confirmed to have used the site. Other launches were conducted, but the pads used by individual rockets were not recorded. Early Kosmos-3M launches used both Site 131 and Site 132.

References

Further reading

Plesetsk Cosmodrome